Charles Foster Willard (October 13, 1883 – February 1, 1977) was an American aviator, and engineer, who became known as the first barnstormer with his trick flights. Willard was the first person taught to fly by Glenn Curtiss in 1909 and was the 10th person to receive an official pilot's licence. Willard made a number of aviation 'firsts'. 
In 1910 Willard made the first ever flight over downtown Los Angeles.  
He was the first person to fly three passengers in the United States. 
Willard has the unfortunate record of being the first person to have his airplane shot out of the sky by a bullet — that of an annoyed farmer who hit his propeller with a squirrel gun.

At the Harvard-Boston Aero Meet of 1910 Charles Willard took Miss Eleanor Ladd of Boston on a flight.  She worked for a Boston newspaper, and was reportedly the first newspaper women in America to fly in an airplane. During the Airshow Willard also took along Army Lieutenant Jacob E. Finkel, a rifle sharpshooter up in his Curtiss biplane.  As Willard circled the airfield, Finkel fired shots from the airplane at targets on the ground, hitting them more often than not.  The “experiment” was considered “highly satisfactory”.

On July 1, 1912, Willard's father, William A. Willard, was pilot Harriet Quimby's passenger when both died in a crash.

References

External links

 Charles Forster Willard 1883-1977 [sic], EarlyAviators.com
 Charles Foster Willard flying a Curtiss aircraft at the Harvard-Boston Aero Meet, September, 1910, Wright State University
 Charles Foster Willard, Museum of Flight

1883 births
1977 deaths
Aviators from Massachusetts
Aviation history of the United States
Barnstormers
People from Boston
People from Melrose, Massachusetts
People from Hull, Massachusetts